Srikumar S. Rao (born 11 April 1951)is an elite coach who works with a select group of entrepreneurs, professionals, and senior executives. He is also a speaker, author, former business school professor and creator of Creativity and Personal Mastery (CPM), a course designed to effect personal transformation. He is a TED speaker, and has authored Are You Ready to Succeed: Unconventional Strategies for Achieving Personal Mastery in Business and Life, which is an international best seller, and Happiness at Work: Be Resilient, Motivated and Successful – No Matter What, a bestseller on Inc.'s "The Business Book Bestseller List." Most recently, he has written Modern Wisdom, Ancient Roots: The Movers and Shakers' Guide to Unstoppable Success. This latest book was the #1 Amazon bestseller in the Personal Transformation & Spirituality as well as #1 Spiritual Growth and #2 in Personal Success & Spirituality. He is also the creator and narrator of the audio-course The Personal Mastery Program.  Most recently, he launched a 45-day course with Mindvalley called "The Quest For Personal Mastery" to help participants let go of limiting beliefs, increase resilience and create a more successful life.

Youth and education 
Rao was born in Bombay (current day Mumbai) in 1951, and received his schooling in Delhi, Rangoon and Kolkata. He graduated from Narendrapur, the flagship school of the Ramakrishna Mission system in West Bengal. He was a physics major at St. Stephen's College, Delhi University, and subsequently obtained an MBA from the Indian Institute of Management, Ahmedabad. Rao then came to the United States as a doctoral student and obtained a Ph.D. in Marketing from Columbia Business School, New York in 1980.

Professional background 
Rao was an executive at Warner Communications from 1973 to 1975. He worked on the advertising strategy for The Exorcist. From 1977 to 1978, Rao was a financial executive in the mergers and acquisition division of the Continental Group. Rao moved to Data Resources, Inc. in 1978, and was promoted to head their marketing research department. He continued in that position when DRI was acquired by McGraw-Hill, and went over to academia in 1983.

Rao was a marketing professor at Baruch College, City University of New York from 1983 to 1985. He then taught at the C.W. Post campus of Long Island University, where he was appointed the Louis and Johanna Vorzimer Professor of Marketing. He was a contributing editor for Success, Financial World and Forbes, and has written hundreds of articles for these publications and others such as Inc., Training and Hemispheres. His article "The Shape of Leadership to Come" was recognized as a "Citations of Excellence Top 50 Papers" winner by Emerald Management Reviews in 2009.

Creativity and Personal Mastery (CPM) 
In 1994, Rao created and began teaching a course known as Creativity and Personal Mastery (CPM) at Long Island University. He moved the course to Columbia Business School in 1999 and taught CPM at Columbia until 2005. He has also taught CPM at London Business School, the Kellogg School of Management at Northwestern University and the Haas School of Business at the University of California at Berkeley. He has spoken to alumni of other business schools including Harvard, Stanford, MIT, Wharton, INSEAD, Dartmouth, Michigan and Duke.

Rao currently teaches Creativity and Personal Mastery privately, in major cities including New York, San Francisco and London, and in corporate settings. CPM has had its own alumni association since it was a course at Columbia.

Training magazine described the course in its Leadership issue of May/June 2012.

Personal 
Rao is married to Meena Rao, the Director of Organic Chemistry Laboratories at Barnard College, Columbia University. He has a daughter, Gowri, who has an MBA from Columbia and is married to Abhinav Agrawal, a Harvard MBA. Gowri and Abhinav both work in San Francisco. His son, Gautam, graduated from Columbia Law School and is an attorney in New York.

Works 
 (2022) Modern Wisdom, Ancient Roots: The Movers and Shakers' Guide to Unstoppable Success
 (2005) Are You Ready to Succeed? Unconventional Strategies to Achieving Personal Mastery in Business and Life
 (2010) Happiness at Work: Be Resilient, Motivated, and Successful- No Matter What
 (2008) The Personal Mastery Program: Discovering Passion and Purpose in Your Life and Work
 (2012) The Happiness Matrix: Creativity & Personal Mastery

References

External links 
 Official Site
 TED Speaker Profile and Talk
 Thinkers 50 Interview

1951 births
Living people
Businesspeople from Mumbai
Ramakrishna Mission schools alumni
Columbia Business School alumni
Indian motivational speakers
Indian emigrants to the United States
American people of Indian descent
American businesspeople